Typhoon Mindulle, known as Typhoon Igme in the Philippines was a typhoon that struck the Philippines, Taiwan and China in 2004, and caused extensive damage in Philippines and Taiwan.

Meteorological history 

The monsoon trough spawned a tropical depression on June 23 near Guam. It tracked westward, becoming a tropical storm that night and slowly strengthened as it continued westward due to vertical wind shear. Land interaction with Luzon to its south weakened Mindulle, and the typhoon weakened as it turned northward. On July 1, Mindulle hit eastern Taiwan before accelerating to the northeast and becoming extratropical near South Korea on July 4.

Impact 

Mindulle caused 56 deaths and property damage estimated around $833 million (in 2004 USD) in Philippines and Taiwan.  In the Philippines, floods left more than 30 dead and more than 10 missing persons.  In southern Taiwan, flooding was the worst experienced in the previous 25 years, with some areas reaching 1.5 m of precipitation over several days, resulting in 22 deaths and 14 missing persons. Floods and landslides occurred at various locations.

References

External links 
 Digital Typhoon : Typhoon 200407 (MINDULLE) - National Institute of Informatics

2004 Pacific typhoon season
Typhoons in Taiwan
Typhoons in the Philippines
2004 in the Philippines
2004 in Taiwan